is a Japanese anthology manga series written and illustrated by Kazuhiro Fujita and published by Shogakukan. The first collection, Yoru no Uta, contains five stories and was released in July 1995. The second collection, Akatsuki no Uta, contains four stories and was released in February 2004.

An original video animation (OVA) adaptation of the story "Puppet Princess", from Yoru no Uta, was produced by TMS Entertainment and released in March 2000. It has been licensed in North America by Media Blasters.

Publication
The first collected volume, includes five stories that were published in Shogakukan's Weekly Shōnen Sunday and Shōnen Sunday Zōkan between 1988 and 1994. The volume was released on July 18, 1995. The second collected volume, includes four stories that were published in Shogakukan's Weekly Shōnen Sunday and Weekly Young Sunday between 1996 and 2003. It was released on February 18, 2004. Shogakukan re-released the volumes in a bunkoban edition on April 15 and May 13, 2006.

Yoru no Uta

Akatsuki no Uta

Puppet Princess
, a story included in the Yoru no Uta collection, was adapted into a 42-minute original video animation (OVA) produced by TMS Entertainment and released on March 24, 2000.

In North America, the OVA was licensed by Media Blasters and released on DVD on August 28, 2001. In August 2020, Media Blasters announced that the OVA would be released on Blu-ray. It was released on Blu-Ray and DVD on February 23, 2021.

References

Further reading

External links
  
 

Manga anthologies
Media Blasters
Shogakukan manga
Shōnen manga
TMS Entertainment